Potassium deficiency has two different contexts:

For the medical condition in humans, see hypokalemia
Potassium deficiency (plants), the disorder in plants